LPAC is a Super PAC founded in 2012 to represent the interests of lesbians in the United States.

LPAC may also refer to:
 LaRouche Political Action Committee, a political action committee comprising part of the Worldwide LaRouche Youth Movement
 Liberty Political Action Conference, a political conference held annually by Campaign for Liberty
 Lincoln Performing Arts Centre, an auditorium in Lincoln, England
 London Planning Advisory Committee, a former organisation of local government in London, England
 Lossless predictive audio compression, a lossless audio compression algorithm
 L-PAC, a chemical substance